Among the dialects of Maldivian language, the Mahl dialect (Maliku bas) has something extra in the writing system. Like the communities speaking other dialects, among the speakers of this dialect too the Thaana alphabet is used in common for writing. However, it was secession of Minicoy from Maldivian rule and affiliating with India which have resulted in the importation of some additional features to the dialect as well as writing system of the Minicoyans.

In 1950s, the Indian government forbade direct travel between Maldivians from the heartland of Maldivian language and Minicoyans. As a result, the group of Maldivians living in Minicoy were isolated from their Maldivian counterparts, thus being presented before all dangers of an acculturation process. It was this point which marked the origin of the Mahl writing systems. From 1950s onward Devanagari script got adopted in writing Mahl. Due to owing to lack of contact during an era of modernization efforts in the Maldivian language during the time of Mohamed Amin Didi and afterwards, 'Malikuthaana' emerged as a distinct form of the Thaana script. Thus it was the start of the Post-Maldivian era in Minicoy which originated the Mahl writing system. Today, being united with the Maldivians by means of technological advancements as well as some other reasons the usage of the 'Malikuthaana' has become extinct and it is once again the standard Thaana alphabets which is being used in place of 'Malikuthaana' in the Mahl writing system.

Devanagari script for Mahl 
Though Mahl is written with Thaana alphabet, around the 1950s a Devanagari script was modified to write Mahl Language.

Unicode support for Thaana characters
Thaana occupies Unicode codepoints 1920-1983 (hexadecimal 0780-07BF).

Maldivian scripts
Mahls